The table shows the highest mountains by prefectures of Japan. Where the highest point of a prefecture is not a peak, it will be separately described.

References 
 田代博、藤本一美、清水長正、高田将志 『山の地図と地形』 山と渓谷社、1996年 
 日本の主な山岳標高 都道府県別最高地点の一覧（国土地理院）
 『山の便利手帳2001』山と渓谷2001年1月号第786号付録、山と渓谷社、2001年、P350

Notes

See also 
 List of mountains and hills of Japan by height
 List of tallest buildings by Japanese prefecture

Highest
Japan